General Baker (1941–2014) was an American labor organizer and activist. General Baker may also refer to:

United Kingdom
Arthur Slade Baker (1863–1943), British Army brigadier general
Geoffrey Baker (British Army officer) (1912–1980), British Army general
Ian Baker (British Army officer) (1927–2005), British Army major general
Randolf Baker (1879–1959), British Army lieutenant general
Thomas Durand Baker (1837–1893), British Army lieutenant general
William Baker (Indian Army officer) (1888–1964), British Indian Army lieutenant general
William Erskine Baker (1808–1881), British Indian Army general

United States
Alpheus Baker (1828–1891), Confederate States Army brigadier general
Chauncey Brooke Baker (1860–1936), U.S. Army brigadier general
Henry Moore Baker (1841–1912), New Hampshire National Guard brigadier general
James H. Baker (politician) (1829–1913), Union Army brevet brigadier general
Laurence S. Baker (1830–1907), Confederate States Army brigadier general
Merton W. Baker (1924–2000), U.S. Air Force major general
Nathaniel B. Baker (1818–1876), Iowa Militia adjutant general
Ralph Baker (general) (born 1960), U.S. Army brigadier general
Royal N. Baker (1918–1976), U.S. Air Force lieutenant general
Thomas Baker (general) (born 1935), U.S. Air Force lieutenant general

Other
Francisco Reynolds Baker (1882–c. 1967), Argentine Army general
John Baker (general) (1936–2007), Australian Army general
Moseley Baker (1802–1848), Republic of Texas militia brigadier general
Valentine Baker (1827–1887), Egyptian Army lieutenant general